John Pitts Sheldon (June 13, 1865July 25, 1933) was an American farmer and farm implement dealer.  He served one term in the Wisconsin State Assembly, representing Lafayette County, Wisconsin.

Biography

Born on his family farm in the town of Willow Springs, Lafayette County, Wisconsin, Sheldon was a farmer and farm implement dealer. In 1913, he moved to Darlington, Wisconsin. Sheldon served on the Lafayette County Board of Supervisors, the Darlington Common Council, and the school board. In 1919, Sheldon served in the Wisconsin State Assembly and was a Republican. Sheldon died at his home in Darlington, Wisconsin, and was in ill health.

Electoral history

| colspan="6" style="text-align:center;background-color: #e9e9e9;"| General Election, November 5, 1918

Notes

1865 births
1933 deaths
People from Darlington, Wisconsin
Businesspeople from Wisconsin
Farmers from Wisconsin
Wisconsin city council members
County supervisors in Wisconsin
School board members in Wisconsin
Republican Party members of the Wisconsin State Assembly
People from Willow Springs, Wisconsin